Pagai is a village on the southeast coast of Tutuila Island, American Samoa. It is located on the edge of Faga'itua Bay, and in between the villages of Faga'itua and Alofau. Pagai is six miles east of Pago Pago.

Pagai straddles the county border between Sa'Ole County and Sua County.

Demographics

References

Villages in American Samoa
Tutuila